Johann Anton Zensus (born February 1, 1958, in Bremerhaven) is a German radio astronomer. He is director at the Max Planck Institute for Radio Astronomy (MPIfR) and honorary professor at the University of Cologne. He is chairman of the collaboration board of the Event Horizon Telescope (EHT).  The collaboration announced the first image of a black hole in April 2019.

Career and research 

Zensus studied physics and astronomy in Cologne, Münster and Bonn and received his doctorate at the University of Münster in 1984. From 1985 to 1988 he worked as a post-doctoral fellow at Caltech and then as a research assistant at the National Radio Astronomy Observatory (NRAO) in Charlottesville. In 1997 he was appointed scientific member of the Max Planck Society and director at the MPIfR in Bonn. He has been an adjunct scientist at NRAO since 2001 and teaches as an Honorary Professor at the University of Cologne since 2005.

As head of the research department for Very Long Baseline Interferometry (VLBI) at the MPIfR, his main research interest are extragalactic radio sources and active galactic nuclei, which he investigates with the VLBI method using radio telescopes on all continents and in space. His research group made decisive contributions to increasing the angular resolution and quality of radio astronomical images with VLBI by integrating the space-bound RadioAstron antenna into the VLBI system of radio telescopes and by developing VLBI with short wavelengths in the millimeter and sub-millimeter wavelength range. His group contributed to the integration of multi-antenna radio observatories (arrays) into the VLBI system by the so-called phasing technique, in which the antennas of an array are synchronized to form a single instrument by special software.

Since 2017 Zensus has been coordinator of the European RadioNet consortium, in which institutions from 13 European countries participate. As Chairman of the Collaboration Board of the Event Horizon Telescope (EHT), Zensus is coordinating international efforts to map supermassive black holes in the universe.

Using RadioAstron and earth bound radio telescopes, Zensus was part of a team that imaged the origin region of the relativistic plasma jet around the supermassive black hole of the nucleus of the galaxy NGC 1275 (Perseus A). The observations  suggested that the origin of this jet originates from a broader region than  previously thought (namely the accretion disk instead of the ergosphere of the black hole).

With another worldwide interconnection of radio telescopes, the Global Millimeter VLBI Array (GMVA), Zensus was involved in a radio astronomical observation of the supermassive black hole in the center of the Milky Way (Sagittarius A*) at a resolution not previously achieved. The source in the center has a major axis of 120 microarcseconds and is of symmetrical, almost round shape. Observations at 3.5 mm wavelength predict that the disturbances caused by scattering in the EHT image of Sagittarius A* (recorded at 1.3 mm wavelength; image computations still in progress) are small.

Through the technical developments, observations, imaging efforts and scientific contributions of his group, and through the coordination of the international EHT observation consortium, Zensus contributed decisively to the image of a supermassive black hole in Messier 87 , which was published in April 2019 and is the first direct picture of a black hole.

Personal life

Zensus is married and has two adult sons. He is a native speaker of  German and fluent in English.

Honors and prizes 

1994 Humboldt Prize (Alexander von Humboldt Foundation)
1999 Max Planck Research Prize (Max Planck Society)
2013 Golden Medal of Merit  (Institute for Applied Astronomy, Sankt Petersburg)
2019 Breakthrough Prize in Fundamental Physics as part of the EHT Collaboration

External links 
Anton Zensus' personal web site

References 

1958 births
Living people
21st-century German astronomers
Radio astronomers
University of Münster alumni
People from Bremerhaven
Humboldt Research Award recipients
California Institute of Technology fellows
Max Planck Institute directors